This is a list of the complete operas of the French composer François-André Danican Philidor (1726–1795).

One of the early masters of the opéra comique, he wrote 27 works in this genre, as well as 3 tragédies lyriques.

List

References
 Rushton, Julian (1992), "Philidor, François-André Danican" in The New Grove Dictionary of Opera, ed. Stanley Sadie (London) 

 
Lists of operas by composer
Lists of compositions by composer